Dolavli is a railway station on the Central line of the Mumbai Suburban Railway network. It is on the Karjat–Khopoli route. Kelavali is the previous station and Lowjee is the next station. Dolavli lies on Karjat–Khopoli State Highway No. 35. From Mumbai–Pune Highway it can be approached through Beed Khurd-Phata or Chauk.

Mumbai Suburban Railway stations
Railway stations in Raigad district
Karjat-Khopoli rail line